Ramzan Rajar is a village in the Jamshoro District of Pakistan.

Populated places in Jamshoro District